Andreas Ritzos ( 1421-1492) also known as (Rico, Ricio, Rizo).  He was a Greek icon painter, from Crete.  Ritzos is considered one of the founding fathers of the Cretan School.  He was affiliated with Angelos Akotantos.  Most of his work stylistically follows the traditional maniera greca.  His children, grandchildren, and great-grandchildren were also painters.  He was one of the most influential painters of the Cretan School along with Andreas Pavias and Angelos Akotantos.  He influenced the works of Georgios Klontzas, Nikolaos Tzafouris, Theophanes the Cretan, Michael Damaskinos and El Greco. According to the Institute for Neohellenic Research, sixty of his paintings have survived.

Biography
Andreas Ritzos was born in Iraklio.  His father Nicholas Ritzo was a seaman and jeweler, and his mother was lady Ergina.  Andreas married Maria and had two sons.  His son Nicholas was a painter.  His other son Thomas was a jeweler and painter.  Andreas is listed as a painter for the first time on July 27, 1451 as Andreas Ritzos pinctor.  Records indicate that in 1454 his coworker Maneas Theologitis vouched for him.

Documents indicate he was active as a painter between 1460 and 1492.  He was also associated with other painters namely George Pelergi and Ioanni Kappadoka.  In one document he testifies to the delivery of items from John Akatanos and in another, he received a loan from Andreas Pavias.  His wife Maria died around 1482.  He split the inheritance with his son Nicholas.  His second marriage was with Nicola Gritti of Agnese.  He signed his paintings three different ways.  Five of his icons were signed in Greek χείρ Ανδρέα Ρέτζου,  Three were signed Andreas Rico de Candia pinxit and finally one was signed Andreas Ricio de Candia.  His grandson was painter Maneas Ritzos.

A significant amount of Madonna and Child paintings by Andreas Ritzos survived.  Many painters chose the subject matter but Duccio, Cimabue, Fra Angelico, and Giotto di Bondone employed a similar mannerism exemplifying the maniera greca.  Most artists of the Cretan School began to employ some attributes of the Venetian school.  One greek artist of Venice Ioannis Permeniates completely adopted a new style of painting which was in line with the Venetian school.

Ritzos popularity shows that both Italian and Greek patrons continued to value the maniera greca and preferred the traditional style.  Many paintings were attributed to the school of Ritzos because they were not signed and resemble the artist's painting style.  There were countless Madonna and Child paintings for comparison. Angelos Akotantos influenced Andreas Pavias and Andreas Ritzos. Andreas Pavias and Ritzos influenced each other both employ the traditional rich gold background but Pavias began to employ the Venetian school.

The Virgin and Child with Crucifixion Narrative and the Ascension of Christ in the gallery are precursors to Georgios Klontzas and Theodore Poulakis All Creation rejoices in Thee. Andreas Pavias Crucifixion of Jesus is another popular work that influenced Georgios Klontzas and Theodore Poulakis All Creation rejoices in Thee. Ritzos Ascension of Christ separates the scenes into different compartments while Andreas Pavias Crucifixion of Jesus utilizes countless figures. Georgios Klontzas Transfiguration and Monastic Scenes 1603, is similar to Ritzos Acension of Christ.

Gallery

Italian Style

See also 
Maniera greca
Jesus Hominum Salvator
The Virgin Pantanassa
Nikolaos Gripiotis

References

External links
Byzantium: faith and power (1261-1557), an exhibition catalog from The Metropolitan Museum of Art (fully available online as PDF), which contains material on Ritzos

Greek painters
Cretan Renaissance painters
1492 deaths
1421 births
Artists from Heraklion
15th-century Greek people
15th-century Greek painters